Because of its classic Old South buildings and scenery, Charleston, South Carolina has been featured in many films and television shows.

Television shows
The following television shows have been filmed in part in or near Charleston, South Carolina.  Filming locations that are identifiable in the final production are indicated in parentheses.  When the filming location was meant to represent Charleston as the setting, an asterisk has been added.

Army Wives, mainly filmed at the old Navy base, in the City of North Charleston, where they built a fake town for the series; a sound stage for the show is located in the Oakridge Shopping Center off Dorchester Road, in the City of North Charleston;  2007-13 (*)
Deadly Pursuits,  1996 TV movie with Tori Spelling (*)
Pilot episode for miniseries El Cid, dramatization of the lives of Citadel cadets; Citadel campus (*)
The 1990s Nickelodeon show Gullah Gullah Island took place on a fictional barrier island near Charleston, South Carolina; one episode featured the family visiting downtown Charleston, showing things like sweet-grass baskets; 1994-98 (*)
TV movie The Hunley on TNT
The Inspectors on CBS; 2015-2019
ABC TV miniseries of the trilogy of North and South (1994, starring Patrick Swayze and Kirstie Alley), Love and War, Heaven & Hell: North & South, Book III; Calhoun Mansion at 16 Meeting St. and Boone Hall Plantation (*)
Palmetto Pointe (*)
The Learning Channel series The Real Estate Pros with local real estate agency Trademark Properties and its owner Richard C. Davis, 2007 (*)
Reckless, 2014, CBS (*)
Scarlett, 1994 TV miniseries based on Alexandra Ripley's sequel to Gone with the Wind (*)
Southern Charm, 2014–present, Bravo reality show (*)
Special Bulletin, a 1983 TV-film on NBC presented as a simulated news broadcast of a nuclear terrorism-related hostage taking and subsequent nuclear explosion resulting in the total destruction of the City of Charleston (*)
Vice Principals Filmed in the North Charleston, South Carolina in the neighborhood of Park Circle.  Scenes that take place in the school were shot on the campus of R.B. Stall High School and also filmed on campus of West Ashley High School.Top Chef Season 14Outer BanksThe Righteous Gemstones

Films

The following movies were filmed at least in part in Charleston, South Carolina.  Identifiable locations shown in the films are indicated in parentheses.  When the filming location was meant to represent Charleston as the setting, an asterisk has been added.Ace Ventura: When Nature Calls, 1995, starring Jim Carrey; #1 film in U.S.Angel Camouflaged 2010, James BrolinThe Break, 1995, Martin Sheen; about tennisChasers 1994, Tom BerengerCold Mountain, 2003, set in the Civil War (1864), starring Nicole Kidman, Jude Law, and Renee Zellweger Consenting Adults, 1992, Kevin Kline and Kevin SpaceyThe Corn Dog ManThe Dangerous Lives of Altar Boys, 2002, starring Emile Hirsch and Kieran Culkin and Jodie FosterDeceiverDear John, starring Amanda Seyfried and Channing Tatum; #1 film in the U.S. (*)Dear Osama bin LadenDie Hard with a Vengeance, 1995, Bruce Willis, Samuel L. Jackson; old Cooper River bridges; #1 film in the U.S.Don't Tell Her It's Me (aka The Boyfriend School)The Double McGuffin, 1979, starring Ernest Borgnine and George Kennedy.For the Boys 1991, Bette Midler and James Caan; set in the 1940sG.I. Joe: Retaliation, 2013, has a scene set at Fort Sumter, in Charleston HarborThe Great Santini, 1979, starring Robert Duvall and Blythe Danner; set in 1962; written by Pat Conroy (*)Halloween (2018 film), starring Jamie Lee Curtis; #1 film at the box office (filmed at Magnolia Cemetery est. 1850; entire movie was filmed in Charleston)
The In Crowd
The Jackal, 1997, starring Bruce Willis, Richard Gere, and Sidney Poitier
Kitty Kitty
The Legend of Bagger Vance, 2000, starring Will Smith, Matt Damon, and Charlize Theron; set in 1930; about golf
Leo, Spanish film
Little Senegal
Look Out, Here Comes Tomorrow
The Lords of Discipline, 1983, written by Pat Conroy (*)
Major League: Back to the Minors 1998, Scott Bakula
Mary Jane's Last Dance
My Man Done Me Wrong
The New Daughter, 2009, Kevin Costner
The Notebook, 2004, upper King St. near Cannon St. and Spring St., and Boone Hall Plantation and Cypress Gardens, Moncks Corner
O, 2001, starring Josh Hartnett, Julia Stiles, Mekhi Phifer, and Martin Sheen; based on Shakespeare's Othello (*)
An Occasional Hell
Other Voices, Other Rooms
Paradise, 1982, Phoebe Cates
The Patriot, 2000, College of Charleston, lower Meeting St. and Cypress Gardens in Goose Creek (*)
The Prince of Tides, 1991, starring Nick Nolte, Barbra Streisand, and Blythe Danner, written by Pat Conroy (#1 film in U.S.)
Quiet Victory: The Charlie Wedemeyer Story
Rich in Love
Swamp Thing, 1982, directed by Wes Craven; filmed at Cypress Gardens
Thin Ice, Coming of age film about a teacher (Kate Jackson) has an affair with one of her students. 1981
White Squall, 1996, starring Jeff Bridges and Ryan Phillipe; about sailing

Lists of television series by setting
Lists of films by setting
 
 
Lists of films and television series